Edmund Lind may refer to:

Edmund Lind (medical officer) (1888–1944), Australian medical officer and soldier
Edmund George Lind (1829–1909), American architect